Taqab may refer to:
 Taqab, Khuzestan (تاقاب - Tāqāb)
 Taqab, South Khorasan (تقاب - Taqāb)